Crosby is a census-designated place in Harris County, Texas, United States. The population was 3,417 at the 2020 census.

History
The site north of U.S. Route 90 (according to some) was an encampment nicknamed Lick Skillet in 1823 by Humphrey Jackson, one of the 300 original colonists to settle Texas. The name "Lick Skillet" came from the phrase, "The East Texas oxen team drivers sipped the spring sweet water and licked their skillets clean."

On August 16, 1824, the Baron de Bastrop granted him title to a league and a labor of land, including the place where he had settled, in what is now Harris County. Jackson next petitioned the Mexican government to form the San Jacinto District under control of the Austin colony; he was elected alcalde of the new district in 1824, 1825, and 1827, and served as ex officio militia captain of the San Jacinto area. Jackson was buried at Crosby. Jackson's Bayou in eastern Harris County is probably named for him.

In 1860, the town was named Gentry after President of the Sabine and Galveston Bay Railroad and Lumber Company, A. M. Gentry who constructed the 41 miles of railroad from Houston to Liberty in what was called the Texas and New Orleans Railroad, Texas Division. The first general store was built in 1865 by Charlie Karcher, and thereafter the town would become a shipping and retail center for lumber and agricultural products.

The railroad was eventually taken over by the Southern Pacific Railroad and rebuilt. The platform which had been built with a sign showing the name "Gentry"  was located and a new depot built. In 1877, the town was renamed by former judge, state representative, legislator, and Vice President of the railroad, Josiah Frasier Crosby, and a post office was established. By 1884 Crosby reported a population of 50, a school, a Baptist church, and a general store. In 1905 it had one school with four teachers and 122 students. As of 1929, the population was about 600, but the Great Depression reduced this number by half. World War II brought the population to over 900, and the population continued to grow.

For a brief 19 days in 1953 (from December 19 to 31), the town of Crosby briefly changed the name to Hope, Texas in order to partake in a contest conducted by comedian Bob Hope. Reported in a news transcript from WBAP-TV in Fort Worth, Texas; "Hope recently announced that he would like to have a pretty girl from every city in the nation named Hope to appear on his television show next Tuesday. Maine, Rhode Island, Michigan, Kansas and Indiana are sending representatives, so the folks in Crosby decided they'de [sic] get into the act. The result: they changed the town's name to Hope and set about naming a queen. The town will keep its new name until New Years Day, then it will become Crosby, Texas, again."

Geography

Crosby is located at  (29.910577, −95.060882).

Climate 
The climate in this area is characterized by hot, humid summers and generally mild to cool winters.  According to the Köppen Climate Classification system, Crosby has a humid subtropical climate, abbreviated "Cfa" on climate maps.

Demographics

As of the 2020 United States census, there were 3,417 people, 1,026 households, and 579 families residing in the CDP. As of the census of 2010, there were 2,299 people. As of the 2000 census, there were 662 households, and 464 families residing in the CDP. The population density was 758.2 people per square mile (292.8/km,2). There were 743 housing units at an average density of 328.7 per square mile (126.9/km2). The racial makeup of the CDP was 74.15% White, 12.72% African American, 0.76% Native American, 0.41% Asian, 10.79% from other races, and 1.17% from two or more races. Hispanic or Latino of any race were 18.38% of the population.

There were 666 households, out of which 35.4% had children under the age of 18 living with them, 49.4% were married couples living together, 15.8% had a female householder with no husband present, and 30.3% were non-families. 26.1% of all households were made up of individuals, and 11.1% had someone living alone who was 65 years of age or older. The average household size was 2.57 and the average family size was 3.09.

In the CDP, the population was spread out, with 28.2% under the age of 18, 10.1% from 18 to 24, 29.1% from 25 to 44, 19.8% from 45 to 64, and 12.8% who were 65 years of age or older. The median age was 32 years. For every 100 females, there were 100 males. For every 100 females age 18 and over, there were 96.2 males.

The median income for a household in the CDP was $35,508, and the median income for a family was $41,458. Males had a median income of $37,244 versus $25,500 for females. The per capita income for the CDP was $14,851. About 9.2% of families and 13.4% of the population were below the poverty line, including 16.7% of those under age 18 and 20.1% of those age 65 or over.

Government and infrastructure
The community is within Harris County Precinct 2. As of 2021 Commissioner Adrian Garcia is the head of the precinct. The precinct operates the Crosby Community Center at 409 Hare Road.

The community is served by the Harris County Sheriff's Office.

Harris Health System (formerly Harris County Hospital District) designated Baytown Health Center in Baytown for ZIP code 77532. The nearest public hospital is Lyndon B. Johnson General Hospital in northeast Houston.

Crosby Volunteer Fire Department

Crosby Volunteer Fire Department, funded by Harris County Emergency Services District #80, was formed in 1942. Their official website is crosbyvfd.org.

Mission statement
The Crosby Volunteer Fire Department is dedicated to protecting life and property by providing effective public education, fire prevention and emergency services.

Protection area
Crosby Volunteer Fire Department protects the unincorporated communities of Crosby and Barrett Station, Texas. The protection area is split into two response districts covered by five stations manned entirely by volunteers from the community.

Parks and recreation
Crosby Park and Crosby Community Center are located at 419 Hare Road.

The Barrett Station/Riley Chambers Community Center is located at 808 Magnolia Ave. Facilities include restrooms, picnic, playground, trails, open shelter, basketball, baseball, riding arena, and football fields.

Crosby Sports Complex is located at 8600 Miller-Wilson Road. It is a  facility with 2 lighted softball fields, 4 lighted baseball fields, picnic tables, and restrooms. Crosby Sports Complex softball fields are maintained by the Crosby Sports Association.

Education

Primary and secondary schools

Public schools
Crosby students attend school in the Crosby Independent School District.

Most of the CDP itself is zoned to Crosby Elementary School and Newport Elementary School, while some portions are zoned to Barrett Elementary School.

Public schools serving all of Crosby ISD include Crosby Kindergarten Center, Drew Intermediate, Crosby Middle School, and Crosby High School.

According to the Texas Education Agency AEIS report in 2007–2008, Crosby ISD served 4,855 students in ZIP code 77532. 21% were African-American, 22.2% Hispanic, 56.1% White, 0.3% Native American, 0.4% Asian.

Private schools
The Crosby International Academy serving K – 12th, the Crosby Christian Academy serving infants – pre-kindergarten, and Sacred Heart Catholic School are in Crosby.

Colleges and universities
Residents of Crosby ISD (and therefore Crosby) are zoned to Lee College.

Public libraries
Crosby is served by the Crosby Branch of Harris County Public Library, adjacent to and outside of the CDP.

Notable people
 Steven Hobbs - murderer and suspected serial killer, sentenced to life imprisonment for sexually assaulting multiple prostitutes and killing at least two

Media
Star Courier 
The Lake Houston Sentinel
The Lake Houston Observer

Transportation
Harris County Transit operates public transportation.

References

External links
  Texas Directory: Crosby 
 

Census-designated places in Harris County, Texas
Census-designated places in Texas
Greater Houston